VHS or Beta is a band originally from Louisville, Kentucky, later based in Brooklyn, New York, that combines elements of rock, house and disco. The band takes their name from the videotape format war of the 1970s and 1980s, where Sony's Beta format competed with JVC's VHS.

Overview
Their self-released debut EP Le Funk found some success on the charts, but the band became better known in the wake of the 2004 album Night on Fire. After two and half years of touring, VHS or Beta recorded 2007's Bring on the Comets in Asheville, North Carolina, marking a slight change in direction towards a more straightforward pop sound, achieved without sacrificing their trademark dance sensibility. 

Later singles "Feel It When You Know" (2009) and "All Summer in a Day" (2010) were issued on their own Chromosome Records label. The band's third album Diamonds and Death was released in September 2011 by Krian Music Group, followed by a dub version of the album in 2012. 

The band's core members are guitarist/vocalist Craig Pfunder and bassist Mark Palgy. Guitarist Zeke Buck and drummer Mark Guidry, both founding members, left the band in 2006 and 2010, respectively. Guitarists Mike McGill and Eric Rodgers, keyboardists Chea Beckley and Jerome Miller, and drummers Jim Orso and Chris Berry have all toured and/or recorded with the band.

Palgy and Pfunder were in early 1990s band Raze with former Elliott and current Wax Fang drummer Kevin Ratterman.

In 2005, VHS or Beta opened for Duran Duran on a leg of the latter's 2005 North American tour.

In popular culture
The band's song "Night on Fire" was featured in Grandma's Boy and on The O.C., in addition to Mack Dawg Production's 2006 Follow Me Around. It was also used as part of the soundtrack for the videogame MLB 06: The Show.
"Burn It All Down" was featured on the soundtrack for the 2009 documentary The September Issue.

Discography

Studio albums
Night on Fire (2004, Astralwerks)
Bring on the Comets (2007, Astralwerks)
Diamonds and Death (2011, Krian Music Group)
Diamonds and Dub (2012, Krian Music Group)

Singles and EPs
On and On EP (1998, Nasty Skrump)
Le Funk EP (2002, ON! Records)
"Solid Gold" (2003, Startime Intl Fader Label Enterprises)
"Night on Fire" (2004, Astralwerks) 
"The Melting Moon" (2005, Astralwerks) 
"You Got Me" (2006, Astralwerks) 
"Can't Believe a Single Word" (2007, Astralwerks) 
"Burn It All Down" (2007, Astralwerks)  
"Feel It When You Know" (2009, Chromosome Records)
"All Summer in a Day" (2010, Chromosome Records)
"Breaking Bones" (2011, Krian Music Group)
"I Found a Reason" (2011, Krian Music Group)
Eyes (The Serge Devant Mixes) EP (2012, Krian Music Group)

Videography
"Messages" (1999)
"You Got Me" (2005) - Directed by Ryan Rickett; Giant Drag's Annie Hardy and Ima Robot's Alex Ebert both appear in the video
"Night on Fire" (2005) - Directed by Ben Dickinson
"Can't Believe a Single Word" (2007) - Directed by Greg Foley
"Breaking Bones" (2011) - Directed by Graham Hill

References

External links
VHS or Beta official website archived Apr 3 2013.
Discogs
Interview with VHS or Beta
Lazy-i Interview: December 2004
 vhs or beta at Rolling Stone

Living people
Astralwerks artists
Dance-punk musical groups
Indie rock musical groups from Kentucky
Musical groups from Louisville, Kentucky
1997 establishments in Kentucky
Year of birth missing (living people)